Capoeta angorae is a species of freshwater cyprinid fish, which is known from a single specimen caught from Turkey. that was 42 cm long. It is also known as the Ankara barb. Not much can be said about its biology, distribution and future therefore.

References 

Angorae
Fish described in 1925
Endemic fauna of Turkey
Taxobox binomials not recognized by IUCN